William Rice may refer to:

Politicians
 William Rice (MP) (died 1588), English politician
 William W. Rice (1826–1896), American statesman, representative from Massachusetts
 William Hyde Rice (1846–1924), businessman and politician in Hawaii

Other people
 William A. Rice (1891–1946), American-born Catholic bishop in Belize
 William "Bill" Rice (1931–2006), American artist, writer, actor, and director
 William B. Rice (1840–1909), American industrialist from Massachusetts
 William Chauncey Rice (1878–1941), American lawyer
 William Craig Rice (1955–2016), American pedagogy expert
 William Gorham Rice (1856–1945), American state and federal government official
 William Harrison Rice (1813–1862), missionary teacher to Hawaii
 William Marsh Rice (1816–1900), American businessman, founder of Rice University
 William North Rice (1845–1928), American geologist
 William Rice (1788) (1788–1863), American merchant and public servant
 William Rice (librarian) (1821–1897), American minister and librarian
 William Rice (rower) (1881–1941), American-Canadian rower
 William S. Rice (1873–1963), American woodblock print artist and art educator
 W. Thomas Rice (1912–2006), American railroad tycoon
 William Rice (food journalist) (1938–2016), American food journalist
 William Rice, character in the film Jumper

See also
 Bill Rice (born 1939), American songwriter
 Will Rice College, a residential college at Rice University in Houston, Texas, U.S.